Leho is largely an Estonian masculine given name. People with the name Leho include:
Leho Laurine (1904–1998), Estonian chess master
Leho Muldre (born 1940), Estonian orchestra conductor, horn player and music teacher
Leho Pent (born 1990), Estonian weightlifter
Leho Tedersoo (born 1980), Estonian mycologist and microbiologist

References

Estonian masculine given names